See also Rado's theorem (Ramsey theory)

In mathematics, Radó's theorem is a result about harmonic functions, named after Tibor Radó. Informally, it says that any "nice looking" shape without holes can be smoothly deformed into a disk.

Suppose Ω is an open, connected and convex subset of the Euclidean space R2 with smooth boundary ∂Ω and suppose that D is the unit disk. Then, given any homeomorphism
μ : ∂D → ∂Ω, there exists a unique harmonic function u : D → Ω such that u = μ on ∂D and u is a diffeomorphism.

References
 R. Schoen, S. T. Yau. (1997) Lectures on Harmonic Maps. International Press, Inc., Boston, Massachusetts. , page 4.

Theorems in harmonic analysis